Lathan Ransom (born July 16, 2002) is an American football safety for the Ohio State Buckeyes.

Early life and high school career
Ransom attended Salpointe Catholic High School in Tucson, Arizona. He was selected to play in the 2020 All-American Bowl. He committed to Ohio State University to play college football.

College career
As a freshman at Ohio State in 2020, Ransom played in seven games and had six tackles. As a sophomore in 2021, he played in 13 games and had 38 tackles and one sack. In the 2022 Rose Bowl, he suffered a broken leg. Ransom returned from the injury in time for the 2022 season. He was one of 12 semi-finalists for the Jim Thorpe Award.

References

External links
Ohio State Buckeyes bio

Living people
Players of American football from Tucson, Arizona
American football safeties
Ohio State Buckeyes football players
2002 births